Better Farming was a monthly newspaper from the early 20th century that originated in Chicago, Illinois.  It provided information about best practices in agriculture and housekeeping. Along with farming advice, fiction and nonfiction pieces, and advertisements, it offered articles for children as well.

Better Farming succeeded Farm, Field, and Fireside (1877) and Farm Press (1906).

References

External links
 Illinois Digital Newspaper Collections: Better Farming (1913-1925)

Defunct newspapers published in Chicago
1913 establishments in Illinois